Irravadee "Dee" Makris (born 20 January 1992) is an American-born Thai footballer who plays as a forward for the Thailand women's national team.

Career
In high school, Makris played for the Rebels of Vestavia Hills High School, where she lettered three times and won the 2007 Alabama state title. She also played for the Birmingham United youth club, where she won three consecutive Alabama state titles and was team captain, and was a five-year member of the Alabama Olympic Development Program. She later attended Furman University, and played for the Paladins from 2010 to 2013. She was included in the Southern Conference All-Freshman team, as well as the Southern Conference Academic Honor Roll, in 2010. In total, she made 74 appearances, scoring 9 goals and recording 10 assists.

Makris has appeared for the Thailand women's national team, including at the 2015 AFF Women's Championship, where she appeared against Australia U20. She was also included in Thailand's squad at the 2019 AFF Women's Championship, appearing against Singapore and Malaysia, scoring a goal against the former.

Personal life
Makris is a native of Vestavia Hills, Alabama. She was born to a Thai mother, and therefore eligible to play for the Thailand women's national team.

International goals

References

External links
 Profile at Soccerdonna.de

1992 births
Living people
People from Vestavia Hills, Alabama
Soccer players from Alabama
Irravadee Makris
American women's soccer players
Irravadee Makris
Irravadee Makris
Women's association football forwards
Furman Paladins women's soccer players